Virginia House of Delegates District 33 elects one of 100 seats in the Virginia House of Delegates, the lower house of the state's bicameral legislature. District 33 includes parts of Frederick, Loudoun and Clarke counties. The district has been represented by Republican Dave LaRock since 2014.

District officeholders

Election results

References

External links 
 

Virginia House of Delegates districts
Government in Loudoun County, Virginia
Frederick County, Virginia
Clarke County, Virginia